An Angel Comes to Brooklyn is a 1945 American comedy film directed by Leslie Goodwins and written by June Carroll and Stanley Paley. The film stars Kaye Dowd, Robert Duke, David Street, Barbara Perry, Charles Kemper and Marguerite d'Alvarez. The film was released on November 27, 1945, by Republic Pictures.

Plot

Cast   
Kaye Dowd as Karen James
Robert Duke as David Randall
David Street as Paul Blake
Barbara Perry as Barbara
Charles Kemper as Phineas Aloysius Higby
Marguerite d'Alvarez as Madame Della
Robert Scheerer as Bob 
Alice Tyrrell as Susie
June Carroll as Kay
Rodney Bell as Oscar
Betzi Beaton as Tiny
Jay Presson Allen as Miss Johnson 
Joe Cappo as Joe
Sherle North as Roxie
Billie Haywood as Theresa
Cliff Allen as Cliff
C. Montague Shaw as Sir Henry Bushnell
Eula Morgan as Olga Ashley
Gladys Gale as Sarah Gibbons
Harry Rose as Michael O'Day
Frank J. Scannell as Brian Hepplestone 
Jack McClendon as Shadow Dancer
Wilton Graff as Rodney Lloyd
Jimmy Conlin as Cornelius Terwilliger
Ralph Dunn as Sgt. O'Rourke

References

External links 
 

1945 films
American comedy films
1945 comedy films
Republic Pictures films
Films directed by Leslie Goodwins
American black-and-white films
1940s English-language films
1940s American films